The BBC Singers are a British chamber choir, and the professional chamber choir of the BBC. Its origins can be traced back to 1924. On 7 March, 2023 the BBC announced its decision to close the choir later in the year.

One of the six BBC Performing Groups, the BBC Singers are based at the BBC's Maida Vale Studios in London.  The only full-time professional British choir, the BBC Singers feature in live concerts, radio transmissions, recordings and education workshops. The choir often performs alongside other BBC Performing Groups, such as the BBC Symphony Orchestra, and is a regular guest at the BBC Proms. Broadcasts are given from locations around the country, including St Giles-without-Cripplegate and St Paul's Knightsbridge.

The BBC Singers regularly perform alongside leading international orchestras and conductors, and makes appearances by invitation at national events such as the funeral of Diana, Princess of Wales in Westminster Abbey.  Notable former members of the group include Sir Peter Pears, Sarah Connolly, Judith Bingham and Harry Christophers.

History 
In 1924, the BBC engaged Stanford Robinson as Chorus Master. He formed a choir for a performance of Rutland Boughton's Immortal Hour.  This choir, known as 'The Wireless Chorus', was thereafter established as a full-time professional choir. In 1927, the BBC created an octet named 'The Wireless Singers', drawn from members of the Wireless Chorus, for performances where fewer singers were required. Guest conductors of both groups during these early years included Sir Edward Elgar, Igor Stravinsky, Arnold Schoenberg and John Barbirolli.

In 1931, the Wireless Chorus was invited to perform at the Festival of the International Society for Contemporary Music, the first time this event had been held in Britain. 

With the arrival of Leslie Woodgate as general chorus master in 1934, the group was renamed the BBC Singers, and divided into two octets, known as Singers A and Singers B, one specialising in less standard repertoire including Renaissance polyphony and madrigals, the other in light music and revue numbers. Singers A were typically paid £1 per week more than Singers B.  In 1939, Woodgate described the operation and function of the various BBC choirs, including the professional choir, in an interview with The Musical Times.

During the Second World War, the choir was forced to relocate several times from its base in Maida Vale, briefly taking up residence in Bristol, Bangor and Bedford. In 1945, the choir gave the premiere of Francis Poulenc's wartime cantata Figure humaine from the Concert Hall of Broadcasting House. After the war, from the late 1940s onwards, the BBC Singers began to tour across Europe, under the direction of conductors such as Herbert von Karajan, Wilhelm Furtwängler and Bruno Walter. In England, the choir it worked with George Enescu, Sir Thomas Beecham, Otto Klemperer and Igor Stravinsky. From 1946, they became a regular feature of the BBC's new radio arts network, the Third Programme.

During the middle years of the twentieth century, the choir premiered major works by Darius Milhaud, Frank Martin, Paul Hindemith, Gerald Finzi, Sir Michael Tippett, Pierre Boulez, Sir Arthur Bliss and Karol Szymanowski.  Pierre Boulez began a lifelong association with the choir in 1964.

Woodgate died in 1961. That same year, Peter Gellhorn took over the choir. He re-organised the professional contingent, scrapping the A-B division in favour of a single force of 28 voices, which was renamed the 'BBC Chorus'. Following the appointment of John Poole as chorus master in 1972, the choir reverted to its previous name, the 'BBC Singers'.

The choir continued to broadcast regularly on BBC Radio 3 and Radio 4, but its long-established participation in The Daily Service had been curtailed to one appearance per week by the early 1990s, after the Rev. David Winter (head of BBC religious broadcasting from 1982 to 1989) judged that its sound was "too clinical" for worship. The appointment of Bo Holten as Guest Conductor in 1991 introduced a new focus and approach to Early Music.  The BBC Singers now work regularly with Early Music specialists, including Peter Phillips (Tallis Scholars) and Robert Hollingworth (I Fagiolini).

Stephen Cleobury, chief conductor of the choir from 1995 to 2007, held the title of conductor laureate with the choir until his death in 2019. Bob Chilcott is the current principal guest conductor of the choir.  David Hill was the most recent conductor from 2007 to 2017.  Sofi Jeannin first guest-conducted the choir in January 2017.  In May 2017, the BBC announced her appointment as the choir's next chief conductor, the first woman to be named to the post, effective July 2018. Head of Orchestras and Choirs Simon Webb announced his decision to close the choir on 7 March, 2023.

Choir directors and chief conductors
 Stanford Robinson (1924–1932)
 Leslie Woodgate (1934–1961)
 Peter Gellhorn (1961–1972)
 John Poole (1972–1989)
 Simon Joly (1989–1995)
 Stephen Cleobury (1995–2007)
 David Hill (2007–2017)
 Sofi Jeannin (2018–present)

Commissioned works
Over its history, the BBC Singers has performed and commissioned more than a hundred new works. These include Gustav Holst's The Morning of the Year (1927), Benjamin Britten's A Boy was Born (1934), and works by Michael Berkeley, Sir Richard Rodney Bennett, John Casken, Sir Peter Maxwell Davies, Thea Musgrave, Edmund Rubbra, Robert Saxton, Sir John Tavener, Sir Michael Tippett and Iannis Xenakis.

Select list of commissioned works:
Judith Bingham – A Winter Walk at Noon – First broadcast 2 March 1986
Benjamin Britten – A Shepherd's Carol & Chorale: Our Father Whose Creative Will – First broadcast 24 December 1944
Sir Peter Maxwell Davies – Apple-Basket: Apple-Blossom – First broadcast 23 December 1990
James Dillon – Viriditas – First broadcast 24 April 1994
Nicola LeFanu – The Story of Mary O'Neill – First broadcast 4 January 1989
Thea Musgrave – For the Time Being: Advent – First broadcast 18 July 1987
Edmund Rubbra – Veni, Creator Spiritus – First broadcast 5 August 1966
Sir Michael Tippett – The Weeping Babe – First broadcast 24 December 1944
Iannis Xenakis – Sea Nymphs – First broadcast 16 September 1994

In 2002, Edward Cowie became the BBC Singers' first Associate Composer, with the functions of composing new works each year for performance by the choir, and participating in workshops with young composers from schools, universities and music colleges.  Judith Bingham was the next to fill this position, in 2004.  Gabriel Jackson took the post in 2010.

Select discography
Judith Bingham – Remoter Worlds – David Hill (conductor) 2008, Catalogue No. Signum Classics SIGCD144
Judith Weir – The Welcome Arrival of Rain – BBC Symphony Orchestra, Martyn Brabbins (conductor) 2008, Catalogue No. NMC D137
Leoš Janáček – The Excursions of Mr Broucek – BBC Symphony Orchestra, Jirí Belohlávek (conductor) 2008
Elizabeth Maconchy – Music for voices – Odaline de la Martinez (conductor) 2007, Catalogue No. LNT127
Sergei Rachmaninoff – Francesca di Rimini – BBC Philharmonic, Gianandrea Noseda (conductor) 2007, Catalogue No. Chandos 10442
Bob Chilcott – Man I Sing – Bob Chilcott, (conductor) 2007, Catalogue No. Signum Classics SIGCD100
Brian Ferneyhough – Choral works – Lontano, Odaline de la Martinez (conductor) 2007, Catalogue No. Metier msv28501
Michael Tippett – Choral Images – Stephen Cleobury (conductor) 2007 Catalogue No. Signum Classics SIGCD092
Paul Dukas – Ariane et Barbe-bleue – BBC Symphony Orchestra, Leon Botstein (conductor) 2007, Catalogue No. TELARC 80680
Benjamin Britten – Death in Venice – City of London Sinfonia, Richard Hickox (conductor) 2005, Chandos 10280(2)
One Star, At Last – A selection of carols of our time  – Stephen Cleobury (conductor) 2005, Catalogue No. Signum Classics SIGCD067
Alexander Levine – Kolokolà – James Morgan (conductor) 2005, Catalogue No. Albany TROY736

See also
BBC Orchestras and Singers

References

Sources
 Sean Street, Historical Dictionary of British Radio, pp. 54–55

External links
 BBC Singers official website
 BBC Singers discography
 Divine Art blog, 'BBC National Chorus and Orchestra & Wireless Singers'
 AllMusic.com page on the BBC Singers

BBC music
British choirs
Classical music in the United Kingdom
Chamber choirs
Musical groups established in 1924
1924 establishments in the United Kingdom
Albany Records artists